The Nicolaus Copernicus University Press (Wydawnictwo Naukowe Uniwersytetu Mikołaja Kopernika, Wydawnictwo Naukowe UMK, Wydawnictwo UMK) is a book publisher founded in 1967. NCU Press is an official department of Nicolaus Copernicus University in Toruń (Poland).

The Nicolaus Copernicus University Press was set up in 1967. It publishes scientific journals, monographs and textbooks and books written by the university scientists.

See also

Nicolaus Copernicus University in Toruń

External links
Official site of the publisher in English
Official site of the University

Nicolaus Copernicus University in Toruń
1967 establishments in Poland
Publishing companies established in 1967
University presses of Poland
Mass media in Toruń
Nicolaus Copernicus University Press, The
Press